Aperturina is a monotypic genus of spiders in the family Linyphiidae. It was first described by Tanasevitch in 2014. , it contains only one species, Aperturina paniculus, found in Thailand and Malaysia.

References

Linyphiidae
Monotypic Araneomorphae genera
Spiders of Asia